Henry Moskowitz (September 27, 1880 – December 18, 1936) was a civil rights activist, and one of the co-founders of the National Association for the Advancement of Colored People.

Biography
He was born on September 27, 1880 in Huși, Romania. He was Jewish. He migrated to the United States in 1883. He attended the New York City public schools and then graduated from the City College of New York in 1899. In 1906 he earned a Ph.D. in philosophy from the University of Erlangen in Germany.

In 1914, he married Belle Lindner Israels (1877–1933). In 1914, New York City mayor John Purroy Mitchel appointed him president of the Municipal Civil Service Commission. In 1917 he served as the Commissioner of Public Markets in New York City. He was the founding Executive Director of the League of New York Theatres  which eventually became The Broadway League, the organization known for producing the Tony Awards

He died on December 18, 1936 in Manhattan, New York City.

Works
 Up from the City Streets: Alfred E. Smith (1927)

Timeline 
 1880 Born in Huși, Romania
 1883 Migrated from Romania to the United States
 1898 Co-founds the Downtown Ethical Society, a settlement house
 1899 Graduates from City College of New York
 1906 Earned his Ph.D. in philosophy from the University of Erlangen in Germany
 1909 Co-founds National Association for the Advancement of Colored People on February 12, 1909
1909 Associate leader of the Society for Ethical Culture of New York
1911 Investigates the Triangle Shirtwaist Factory fire
1912 Runs for Congress from the 12th District as a Progressive Party
1912 Rejects censorship in movies
1914 Appointed president of the Municipal Civil Service Commission
1914 Married Belle Lindner Israels (1877–1933)
1917 Commissioner of Public Markets for New York City
1925 Trip to Europe to observe the plight of Jews in Poland
1932 Director of the League of New York Theatres
1933 Death of wife on January 2, 1933
1933 Trip to Europe to observe the plight of Jews in Germany
1936 Death in Manhattan on December 18, 1936

See also
African-American – Jewish relations

References

Further reading 
 Elisabeth Israels Perry, Belle Moskowitz:  Feminine Politics and the Exercise of Power in the Age of Alfred E. Smith.  New York:  Oxford University Press, 1987; Routledge, 1992; Northeastern, 2000.

1880 births
1936 deaths
NAACP activists
Commissioners of Public Markets
American people of Romanian-Jewish descent
Romanian emigrants to the United States
Romanian Jews
Progressive Era in the United States